William St. Clair Grant Snr. (20 July 1853 – 17 February 1896) was a Scotland international rugby union player.

Rugby Union career

Amateur career

Grant played for Craigmount RFC.

Provincial career

Grant represented Edinburgh District. He played in the world's first two representative provincial matches in the 1872–73 season.

International career

Grant represented the Scotland international rugby union team twice.

Family

His son William St Clair Grant was a cricketer.

References

Sources

 Bath, Richard (ed.) The Scotland Rugby Miscellany (Vision Sports Publishing Ltd, 2007 )
 Massie, Allan A Portrait of Scottish Rugby (Polygon, Edinburgh)

1853 births
1896 deaths
Edinburgh District (rugby union) players
Scottish rugby union players
Scotland international rugby union players